Most of What Follows is True is an album by The Sights.

References

2010 albums